A hamlet is a human settlement that is smaller than a town or village. Its size relative to a parish can depend on the administration and region. A hamlet may be considered to be a smaller settlement or subdivision or satellite entity to a larger settlement.

The word and concept of a hamlet has roots in the Anglo-Norman settlement of England, where the old French  came to apply to small human settlements.

Etymology 

The word comes from Anglo-Norman , corresponding to Old French , the diminutive of Old French  meaning a little village.  This, in turn, is a diminutive of Old French , possibly borrowed from (West Germanic) Franconian languages. Compare with modern French , Dutch , Frisian , German , Old English  and Modern English home.

By country

Afghanistan 
In Afghanistan, the counterpart of the hamlet is the qala (Dari: قلعه, Pashto: کلي) meaning "fort" or "hamlet". The Afghan qala is a fortified group of houses, generally with its own community building such as a mosque, but without its own marketplace. The qala is the smallest type of settlement in Afghan society, outsized by the village (Dari/Pashto: ده), which is larger and includes a commercial area.

Canada 
In Canada's three territories, hamlets are officially designated municipalities. As of January 1, 2010:

 Northwest Territories had 11 hamlets, each of which had a population of less than 900 people as of the 2016 census;
 Nunavut had 24 hamlets, with populations ranging from 129 to 2,842 as of the 2016 census; and
 Yukon had two hamlets, both of which had a population of less than 450 people as of the 2016 census.

In Canada's provinces, hamlets are usually small unincorporated communities within a larger municipality (similar to civil townships in the United States), such as many communities within the single-tier municipalities of Ontario or within Alberta's specialized and rural municipalities.

Canada's two largest hamlets—Fort McMurray (formerly incorporated as a city) and Sherwood Park—are located in Alberta. They each have populations, within their main urban area, in excess of 60,000—well in excess of the 10,000-person threshold that can choose to incorporate as a city in Alberta. The designation of these urban areas as a "hamlet" is simply to enable their residents to participate in the politics of their surrounding counties. As such, these two hamlets have been further designated by the Province of Alberta as urban service areas. An urban service area is recognized as equivalent to a city for the purposes of provincial and federal program delivery and grant eligibility.

France 
A hamlet, is a group of rural dwellings, usually too small to be considered a village. The term  is also applied to hamlets, but this can also refer to non-inhabited localities.

During the 18th century, for rich or noble people, it was fashionable to create their own  in their gardens. These were a group of houses or farms with rustic appearance, but in fact were very comfortable.

Germany 
A Weiler has, compared to a Dorf (village), no infrastructure (i.e. no inn, no school, no store, no church). The houses and farms of a Weiler can be grouped (in the hills and the mountains) or scattered (more often in the plains). In North West Germany, a group of scattered farms is called Bauerschaft. In a Weiler there are no street names, the houses are just numbered.

There is no legal definition of a hamlet in Germany. In Bavaria, like in Austria, a Weiler is defined as a settlement with 3 to 9 dwellings, from 10 houses it is called a village. A hamlet does not usually form its own administrative unit, but is part of a larger municipality.

Großweiher (population 15) is an example of a Weiler in Bavaria, consisting of two farms, three more dwellings and a chapel. It is part of the municipality of Moosthenning and the parish of Ottering.
Süderhöft is an example of a Weiler in Holstein (population 19), consisting of a farm and five scattered houses. Süderhöft is part of the parish of Schwabstedt, but forms its own municipality and is therefore a rare exception.

India 
In different states of India, there are different words for hamlet. In Haryana and Rajasthan it is called "dhani" or "Thok". In Gujarat a hamlet is called a "nesada", which are more prevalent in the Gir forest. In Maharashtra it's called a "pada". In southern Bihar, especially in the Magadh division, a hamlet is called a "bigha". In state of Karnataka, Hamlet (place of human settlement) is known by different names like Palya, Hadi(Haadi),Keri and Padi(Paadi). In olden days the human population of hamlet was less than Halli(Village) or Ooru(Uru). But in 20th century with tremendous increase in population, some of these hamlets have become villages, towns, cities or merged with them.

Indonesia 

Netherlands 
A gehucht or buurtschap has, compared to a dorp (village), no infrastructure (i.e. no inn, no school, no store) and contains often only one street, bearing the same name. The houses and farms of a gehucht or a buurtschap can be scattered. Though there are strong similarities between a gehucht and buurtschap, the words are not interchangeable. A gehucht officially counts as an independent place of residence (e.g. Wateren), while a buurtschap officially is a part of an other place (e.g. Bartlehiem, part of Wyns).

Pakistan 
In Pakistan a hamlet is called a  gaaon گاؤں or mauza موضع in Urdu, giraaan گراں or pind پنڈ in Punjabi, and kalay کلې in Pashto. It is almost synonymous to 'village'.

Poland 
In Poland a hamlet is called osada, and is legally a small rural settlement, especially differing by type of buildings or inhabited by population connected with some place or workplace (like mill hamlet, forest hamlet, fishermen hamlet, railway hamlet, State Agricultural Farm hamlet). It can be an independent settlement, or a part of another settlement, like a village.

Romania 

In Romania hamlets are called , and they represent villages that contain several houses at most. They are legally considered villages, and statistically, they are placed in the same category. Like villages, they do not have a separate administration, and thus are not an administrative division, but are part of a parent commune.

Russia 
In the Russian language there are several words which mean "a hamlet", but all of them are approximately equal. The most common word is деревня (derevnia, the word meant "an arable" in the past); the words село (selo, from the Russian word селиться (selit'tsa), meaning "to settle") and посёлок (posiolok) are quite frequently used, too. Parallel to many other cultures, a distinction was often that selo has a church and derevnia has not.

The once common Russian word хутор (khutor) for the smallest type of rural settlement (arguably closest in nature to the English hamlet) is now mostly obsolete. The state of USSR wanted to have some form of basic infrastructure and central authority at each and every settlement. Obviously, this is the opposite of hamlet - a place without neither for being too small to meaningfully support those. Even without state pressure, once one of the neighboring khutors got a permanent shop, school, community center (known in Russia as дом культуры, "house of culture"), maybe a medical post, others would naturally relocate closer, drawing together into one village.

Thus, the dimunitie form деревенька (derevenka, tiny derevnia) is in widespread, albeit unofficial, use to denote such settlements, which mostly possess the amenities of a village yet the size of hamlet.

Spain 
In Spain a hamlet is called . The word comes from the Spanish term  («estate»). In the South of Spain, the term  is also used for designating small groups of rural dwellings or farmhouses.

A hamlet in Spain is a human settlement, usually located in rural areas, and typically smaller in size and population than a village (called in Spain). The hamlet is a common territorial organisation in the North West of Spain (Asturias, Cantabria and Galicia) dependent on a larger entity (e.g. parish or municipality).

In Spain, the hamlet is one of the categories in the official gazetteer of population entities. In the Royal Order and Instruction of the 8 of March 1930, issued for the elaboration of the Annual gazetteer, the hamlet is defined as the population entity with the smallest population and neighbourhood, usually more disseminated than the lugar, though its buildings can be also organised in streets and plazas.

Switzerland 
A hamlet is always part of a larger municipality or may be shared between two municipalities. The difference between a hamlet and a village is that typically a hamlet lacks a compact core settlement and lacks a central building such as a church or inn. However, some hamlets may have grown up as an unplanned settlement around a church. There is no population limit that defines a hamlet and some hamlets have a larger population than some of the smallest municipalities. Generally there are no street names in a hamlet; rather, addresses are given by hamlet name and a number. House numbers might start at one side of the hamlet and continue to the other side or may have no clear organization.

Turkey 

Ukraine 
There also existed such places like volia, sloboda, huta, buda and others.

United Kingdom 
England

In England, the word hamlet (having the French origin given at the top of this article), means a village or a town without a church, although hamlets are recognised as part of land use planning policies and administration. In modern usage it generally refers to a secondary settlement in a civil parish, after the main settlement (if any); such an example is the hamlet of Chipping being the secondary settlement within the civil parish of Buckland. Hamlets may have been formed around a single source of economic activity such as a farm, mill, mine or harbour that employed its working population. Some hamlets may be the result of the depopulation of a village; an example of such a hamlet is Graby or Shapwick.  Because of the hilly topography of the parish, the village of Clent, situated on the Clent Hills, consists of five distinct hamlets.

Wales
The term hamlet was used in Wales to denote a geographical subdivision of a parish (which might or might not contain a settlement). Elsewhere, mostly in England, these subdivisions were called "townships" or "tithings".

Scotland
In the Scottish Highlands the term , of Gaelic derivation, may be preferred to the term hamlet. Also found in Scotland more generally is  used in the specific case of a farm settlement, including outbuildings and agricultural workers' homes.

Northern Ireland
In Northern Ireland the common Irish place name element  is sometimes considered equivalent to the term hamlet in English, although  would actually have referred to what is known in English today as a townland: that is to say, a geographical locality rather than a small village.

United States

Mississippi 
In Mississippi, a 2009 state law (§ 17-27-5) set aside the term "municipal historical hamlet" to designate any former city, town, or village with a current population of less than 600 inhabitants that lost its charter before 1945. The first such designation was applied to Bogue Chitto, Lincoln County.

New York 

In New York, hamlets are unincorporated settlements within towns. Hamlets are not legal entities and have no local government or official boundaries. Their approximate locations will often be noted on road signs, however, a specific service, such as water, sewer, or lighting to provide only that hamlet with services. A hamlet could be described as the rural or suburban equivalent of a neighborhood in a city or village. The area of a hamlet may not be exactly defined; it may be designated by the Census Bureau, or it may rely on some other form of border (such as a ZIP Code, school district or fire district for more urbanized areas; rural hamlets are typically only demarcated by speed zones on the roads serving them). Others, such as Forestville, New York, will be the remnants of former villages, with borders coextant with the previously defined borders of the defunct or dissolved village. Some hamlets proximate to urban areas are sometimes continuous with their cities and appear to be neighborhoods, but they still are under the jurisdiction of the town. Some localities designated as hamlets, such as Levittown in the Town of Hempstead, with a population of over 50,000, are more populous than some incorporated cities in the state.

Oregon 

In Oregon, specifically in Clackamas County, a hamlet is a form of local government for small communities that allows the citizens therein to organize and co-ordinate community activities. Hamlets do not provide services such as utilities or fire protection, and do not have the authority to levy taxes or fees. There are four hamlets in Oregon: Beavercreek, Mulino, Molalla Prairie, and Stafford.

Vietnam 

In Vietnam, a hamlet is the smallest unofficial administrative unit. It is a subdivision of a commune or township.

See also 
 Developed environments
 Dhani and villages
 Frazione
 Manorialism
 Types of inhabited localities in Russia

References

External links 

 Wolfhampcote: A hamlet formed by depopulation
 Low Mill: A mill hamlet

Types of populated places